Jan V Thurzo (1464–1520) was a 15th-century Bishop of Wroclaw in Silesia, now Poland. A great patron and lover of the arts and sciences, Martin Luther called him "the greatest bishop of the century".

Jan was the son of János Thurzó a protestant, Zips Saxon Hungarian nobleman of the Thurzó family and mayor of Kraków, and his first wife, Ursula Bem. Jan gained a Bachelor of Arts in 1484 and a master's degree in 1487, and then studied canon law in Italy.

He was Dean of Wroclaw Cathedral from March 1502 and Bishop of Wroclaw from 1506 to 1520, while his brother Stanislav was Bishop of Olomouc. As bishop, Jan Thurzo was patron of artists, including Albrecht Dürer and Lucas Cranach, and poets. He corresponded with Martin Luther on matters of theology and was involved in the founding of University of Wittenberg.

See also 
 List of bishops of Wroclaw
 History of Wroclaw

Notes

References

Further reading 
 
 . "Johann V (Turzo), Bischof von Breslau" [John V (Turzo), Bishop of Breslau]. Alegemeine Deutsche Biographie [General German biography]. Vol. 14. pp. 188–189.
 
 
 

Prince-Bishops of Breslau
Janos
16th-century Roman Catholic bishops in Poland
1464 births
1520 deaths
People from Kraków
People from Wrocław